The 2008 CN International was a Grand Prix show jumping event held at Spruce Meadows in Calgary, Alberta, Canada on September 7, 2008 during the 2008 CSIO Spruce Meadows 'Masters' Tournament. With a $1,000,000 purse, the CN International is one of the richest show jumping events in the world. Nick Skelton of the United Kingdom won the event riding Arko III, obtaining only one penalty over the two rounds of competition to claim the $325,000 first prize.

Results

Round 1

Round 2

References

CN